Ferrocarril Mexicali y Golfo was a railroad line in Baja California, Mexico, established in 1901. Within a few years a controlling interest in the railroad was bought by the American Southern Pacific Railroad company.  The line eventually built was a predecessor to the Ferrocarril Sonora – Baja California.  In 1929 the Mexicali y Golfo was reorganized as the southern line of the Inter-California Railway, under the name Ferrocarril Intercalifornia del Sur.

See also
 List of Mexican railroads

References

Mexicali y Golfo
History of Baja California
Transportation in Baja California
Railway companies established in 1901
1901 establishments in Mexico
Railway companies disestablished in 1929